John Edmund de Courcy  OFM  was an English Bishop in Ireland in the late 15th and early 16th centuries: he was Bishop of Clogher. He was appointed Bishop of Clogher on 14 June 1484; and Bishop of Ross on 26 September 1494, a position he resigned in 1517. He died on 14 March 1519.

References

15th-century Roman Catholic bishops in Ireland
Pre-Reformation bishops of Clogher
Pre-Reformation bishops of Ross (Ireland)
1505 deaths
16th-century Roman Catholic bishops in Ireland